The following lists down built heritage found in Bulakan, Bulacan, Philippines pursuant to the Republic Act No. 10066 or the National Cultural Heritage Act of 2009.

|}

References

Bulakan
Buildings and structures in Bulacan